Sir James John Fraser, 3rd Baronet  (1789–5 June 1834) was a lieutenant-colonel in the British Army (1828).

Biography
Fraser was descended from Alexander Fraser, second son of Hugh Fraser, 1st Lord Lovat (1426), and was the second son of Sir William 1st Baronet, F.R.S. by Elizabeth, daughter of James Farquharson, esq., merchant, of London; and succeeded to the title, 23 December 1827, on the death of his brother Sir William Fraser, 2nd Baronet.

Fraser served with the 7th Hussars in Spain during the Peninsular War, and was on the staff of the Duke of Wellington during the Waterloo Campaign. He died on 5 June 1834, at his seat, Uddens House, Dorsetshire, after a short illness, aged 45, leaving a widow and three sons.

There are memorial inscriptions to Fraser in All Saints' Church, Langton Long Blandford, at Wimborne Minster, Dorset and on the family memorial tablet in Boleskine Old Churchyard, Drumtemple, Invernesshire.

Family
The eldest son, Sir William Fraser, 4th Baronet was born in 1826, graduated B.A. and M.A. at Christ Church, Oxford, and in 1847 was appointed an officer in the 1st Life Guards, and subsequently captain. In 1852 and 1857 he was the member of parliament for Barnstaple. His brother, Charles Craufurd, was a Lieutenant-Colonel 11th Hussars, V.C. 1861, was at one time aide-de-camp to the lord-lieutenant of Ireland, and distinguished himself in India. The youngest brother, James Keith, was in 1860 a captain first life guards.

References

7th Queen's Own Hussars officers
British Army personnel of the Napoleonic Wars
Baronets in the Baronetage of the United Kingdom
1834 deaths
1789 births